Tyson Smith (born October 9, 1981) is a former American football defensive lineman. He was signed by the Baltimore Ravens as an undrafted free agent in 2005. He played college football at Iowa State.

Smith was also a member of the New York Giants, San Francisco 49ers, Washington Redskins, Dallas Cowboys, Miami Dolphins, Denver Broncos, Tennessee Titans and Iowa Barnstormers.

External links
Just Sports Stats
Denver Broncos bio
Iowa Barnstormers bio
Tennessee Titans bio

1981 births
Living people
Players of American football from Iowa
American football linebackers
Iowa State Cyclones football players
Baltimore Ravens players
Rhein Fire players
New York Giants players
San Francisco 49ers players
Washington Redskins players
Dallas Cowboys players
Miami Dolphins players
Denver Broncos players
Tennessee Titans players
Iowa Barnstormers players